C21 was a Danish boy band consisting of three key members: Søren Bregendal (vocals, lyricist, producer and keyboards), Esben Duus (vocals, lyricist and guitar), and David Pepke (vocals, lyricist and guitar). The band has sold more than 40,000 copies in their native country Denmark, and more than 250,000 copies in Asia.

The band was formed in 1998 when Danish music producer Lars Quang heard Søren Bregendal singing in the locker room after his son's football game. Quang invited Søren Brengedal to his studio to test his vocals. Søren brought his fellow school friend, Esben Duus to the studio. At a warm up gig at a birthday party, the two met fellow musician David Pepke and the trio was formed. C21 have only just begun profiling themselves on the music scene. Their self-titled debut album was released on 27 January 2003.

Their 2003 debut album C21 was the most successful Danish boy band debut album in Denmark. The first single, "Stuck in My Heart", was released on 16 September 2002 as the breakthrough single for the group and became popular in South-East Asia (namely Thailand). Further singles included "You Are the One" and "She Cries". The fourth single, "One Night in Bangkok", was released on 29 September 2003. The song was originally done by Murray Head in 1984.

C21's second album Listen was also their last. Released on 24 May 2004, two singles was released off the album, with "All That I Want" entering the Danish singles chart at #6 on 30 April 2004.

In March 2005, Esben Duus left the band, and during the recording of the third album, the remaining members Bregendal and Pepke decided to split, with Søren Bregendal pursuing a solo music and acting career.

In June 2014, the group reunited playing the hit songs "Stuck In My Heart", "All That I Want" and "You Just Wait And See" at Løven & Bastionen in Copenhagen. The occasion was the wedding of a close friend to Søren Bregendal. This has been the only reunification of C21 to date.

Discography

Studio albums

Singles

References

External links
Sing365 - C21 Biography

Musical groups established in 1998
Musical groups disestablished in 2005
Danish musical groups
Danish boy bands
Danish pop music groups
English-language singers from Denmark